The Krogh Length, is the distance between capillaries at which nutrients diffuse to based on cellular consumption of the nutrients.

It can be described as:

Units are in terms of length.

See also
 August Krogh
 Biomedical engineering
 Capillaries
 Diffusion
 Biot number
 Peclet number

References

Cardiovascular physiology
Biomedical engineering
Fluid mechanics